The 2010 FIBA Europe Under-16 Championship for Women was the 22nd edition of the FIBA Europe Under-16 Championship for Women. 16 teams featured the competition, held in Greece from August 12–22. Spain was the defending champion.

Teams

  Runners-up, 2009 FIBA Europe Under-16 Championship for Women Division B

  Winners, 2009 FIBA Europe Under-16 Championship for Women Division B

Group stages

Preliminary round
In this round, the sixteen teams were allocated in four groups of four teams each. The top three qualified for the Qualifying Round. The last team of each group played for the 13th–16th place in the Classification Games.

Times given below are in EEST (UTC+3).

Group A

Group B

Group C

Group D

Qualifying round
The twelve teams remaining were allocated in two groups of six teams each. The four top teams advanced to the quarterfinals. The last two teams of each group played for the 9th–12th place.

Group E

Group F

Classification round
The last teams of each group in the Preliminary Round will compete in this Classification Round. The four teams will play in one group. The last two teams will be relegated to Division B for the next season.

Group G

Knockout round

Championship

Quarterfinals

Semifinals

Bronze-medal game

Final

5th–8th playoffs

5th–8th semifinals

7th place playoff

5th place playoff

9th–12th playoffs

9th–12th semifinals

11th place playoff

9th place playoff

Final standings

Awards

All-Tournament Team

 Olivia Epoupa
 Lana Pačkovski
 Nataša Kovačević
 Kourtney Treffers
 Anna Shchetina

Fair Play Award

Statistical leaders

Points

Rebounds

Assists

Blocks

Steals

External links
Official Site

2010
2010–11 in European women's basketball
2010–11 in Greek basketball
International youth basketball competitions hosted by Greece
International women's basketball competitions hosted by Greece
Kozani
2010 in youth sport